Xenotrachea albidisca is a species of moth of the family Noctuidae. It is found in India, western China, Taiwan, Vietnam and Borneo.

References

Moths described in 1867
Hadeninae